Antonín Hojer (31 March 1894 – 20 October 1964) was a former Czechoslovak footballer. He played 35 games and scored 3 goals for the Czechoslovakia national football team. Hojer represented Czechoslovakia at the 1920 Olympics and 1924 Olympics. His younger brother František was also a Czechoslovak footballer.

References

External links
 

1894 births
1964 deaths
Czech footballers
Czechoslovak footballers
Czechoslovakia international footballers
AC Sparta Prague players
Olympic footballers of Czechoslovakia
Footballers at the 1920 Summer Olympics
Footballers at the 1924 Summer Olympics
Association football defenders
Footballers from Prague
People from the Kingdom of Bohemia